Elections to the French National Assembly were held in French Somaliland on 17 June 1951 as part of the wider French parliamentary elections. Edmond Magendie was elected as the territory's MP, defeating the incumbent Jean-Carles Martine.

Results

References

French Somaliland
1951 in French Somaliland
Elections in Djibouti
June 1951 events in Africa